Latin iota (majuscule: Ɩ, minuscule: ɩ) is a letter of the Latin alphabet, based on the lowercase of the Greek letter iota (ι).

It was formerly used in the International Phonetic Alphabet to represent  (the vowel in English "bit"). It was replaced by a small capital I (ɪ) in 1989, but it can still be found in use in some later works. Other variations are used for phonetic transcription: , .

Ɩ has been adopted as a letter in the alphabets of some African languages, such as Gurunɛ, Kabiyé or Mossi. Its capital form has a hook to distinguish it from capital I. The accented italic form ɩ is very often indistinguishable from the italic letter small I i in serif fonts.

References

Latin-script letters
Phonetic transcription symbols
Vowel letters